The 1967 UC Riverside Highlanders football team represented the University of California, Riverside as an independent during the 1967 NCAA College Division football season. Led by third-year head coach Pete Kettela, UC Riverside compiled a record of 4–4–1 The team was outscored by its opponents 180 to 169 for the season. The Highlanders played home games at Highlander Stadium in Riverside, California.

Schedule

References

UC Riverside
UC Riverside Highlanders football seasons
UC Riverside Highlanders football